Virgil is a village in Virgil Township, Kane County, Illinois, United States. It was incorporated on November 6, 1990. The population was 329 at the 2010 census, up from 266 in 2000.

History 

Virgil was the site of the 2010 Illinois earthquake's epicenter in the early morning hours of February 10.

Geography
Virgil is located in western Kane County at  (41.9566341, -88.5286920). Illinois Route 64 passes through the village center, leading east  to St. Charles and west  to Sycamore.

Demographics

As of the census of 2000, there were 266 people, 86 households, and 73 families residing in the village. The racial makeup of the village was 97.37% White, 1.13% African American, 0.38% Asian, 0.38% from other races, and 0.75% from two or more races. Hispanic or Latino of any race were 1.88% of the population.

There were 86 households, out of which 50.0% had children under the age of 18 living with them, 69.8% were married couples living together, 11.6% had a female householder with no husband present, and 14.0% were non-families. 12.8% of all households were made up of individuals, and 3.5% had someone living alone who was 65 years of age or older.  The average household size was 3.09 and the average family size was 3.38.

In the village, the population was spread out, with 35.3% under the age of 18, 4.9% from 18 to 24, 33.5% from 25 to 44, 22.6% from 45 to 64, and 3.8% who were 65 years of age or older.  The median age was 33 years. For every 100 females, there were 98.5 males.  For every 100 females age 18 and over, there were 93.3 males.

The median income for a household in the village was $78,252, and the median income for a family was $80,687. Males had a median income of $45,000 versus $30,417 for females. The per capita income for the village was $26,881.  None of the families and 0.4% of the population were living below the poverty line.

See also

 List of towns and villages in Illinois

References

External links
 

Villages in Kane County, Illinois
Villages in Illinois
Earthquakes in Illinois
Populated places established in 1990
1990 establishments in Illinois